Roy McCrohan (22 September 1930 – 3 March 2015) was an English professional footballer who played as a wing half.

Career
Born in Reading, Berkshire, McCrohan spent the majority of his career with Norwich City before playing for Colchester United and Bristol Rovers. He was a member of the Norwich sides which reached the semi-finals of the FA Cup in 1959 as a third division team, won promotion to division two in 1960 and won the League Cup in 1962. He later coached at Bristol Rovers, Aldershot, Fulham and Ipswich Town, both the latter two with Bobby Robson, and was assistant manager at Luton Town before moving to live in the USA. He was an assistant coach for the Detroit Express for the 1978 NASL season. He was named head coach of the Minnesota Kicks on 14 December 1978. He coached the team for the 1979 NASL season and first nine games of the 1980 NASL season.

Death

McCrohan died on 3 March 2015 in the West Country after a long illness.

Honours

Club
Norwich City
 Football League Cup Winner (1): 1961–62
 Football League Third Division Runner-up (1): 1959–60

References
Canary Citizens by Mark Davage, John Eastwood, Kevin Platt, published by Jarrold Publishing, (2001), 

1930 births
2015 deaths
Bristol Rovers F.C. players
Colchester United F.C. players
English footballers
English football managers
Norwich City F.C. players
Sportspeople from Reading, Berkshire
North American Soccer League (1968–1984) coaches
Reading F.C. players
Association football midfielders
Footballers from Berkshire